Habelia is a genus of extinct arthropod from the Middle Cambrian.  Its fossils have been found in the Burgess Shale in British Columbia, Canada. Fifty-four specimens of Habelia are known from the Greater Phyllopod bed, where they comprise 0.1% of the community. While previously enigmatic, a 2017 redescription found that it formed a clade (Habeliida) with Sanctacaris, Utahcaris, Wisangocaris and Messorocaris as a stem-group to Chelicerata. Habelia is thought to have been durophagous, feeding on hard shelled organisms.

References

Further reading
 Invertebrate Palaeontology & Evolution by Euan Neilson Kerr Clarkson
 Wonderful Life: The Burgess Shale and the Nature of History by Stephen Jay Gould

External links

Habelia in the Paleobiology Database

Prehistoric arthropod genera
Burgess Shale fossils
Cambrian arthropods
Cambrian arthropods of North America
Cambrian genus extinctions
Fossil taxa described in 1912